Valea Sânpetrului may refer to:

In Romania:
 Valea Sânpetrului, a village in Grebenișu de Câmpie commune, Mureș County 
 Valea Sânpetrului, a village in Pogăceaua commune, Mureș County